The Kambar-Ata Dam (also known as Kambar-Ata 1 or Kambaratinsk Dam) is a proposed dam on the Naryn River in central Kyrgyzstan. The Kambar-Ati-1 Hydro Power Plant at the base of the dam will have a capacity of around 2,000 megawatts. The project will be constructed jointly with Russia and possibly Kazakhstan as well.

The dam will be created by using about 440,000 metric tonnes of explosives to blast the canyon walls, causing landslides that will block the Naryn River. This strategy will save time and money over conventional embankment building methods. The hydroelectric power plant, spillway and other associated structures will be completed separately.

The first attempt to build a dam at this site was in 1986, but construction stopped due to the collapse of the Soviet Union in 1991. The project was reinstated in 2008 and will be largely funded by US$2 billion in Russian aid, promised in return for "enhanced economic and security cooperation" with Russia. It is hoped that this dam and others on the Naryn will help Kyrgyzstan become a major electricity exporter, helping the country's fragile economy. Test drilling work at the dam site began in August 2013.

Downstream Uzbekistan opposes the project, as the initial filling of the reservoir, and annual evaporation henceforth, would reduce the flow available in the Syr Darya for irrigation. Power generated by the dam, if exported to southern countries such as Afghanistan, could also hurt Uzbekistan's market for electricity export. According to the Uzbek government in Tashkent, Kambarata-I will also cause water shortages, as well as environmental and economic damage to Uzbekistan, and is being proposed in breach of international law.

Experts interviewed by the International Crisis Group have indicated that in spite of Uzbekistan's ire regarding the project, Kambarata-I and other such projects could improve water management in the region since the dams will collect and store water that could later be released for irrigation. However, water specialists have also stated that there is a lack of political will to solve this issue.

On January 6, 2023, the energy ministers of Uzbekistan, Kazakhstan and Kyrgyzstan signed a roadmap for the project. Preparations for the construction of the hydroelectric power station have already begun: roads, bridges, power lines, construction sites are being built.

See also

Kambar-Ata-2 Hydroelectric Power Station – built downstream

References

Hydroelectric power stations in Kyrgyzstan
Proposed hydroelectric power stations
Dams in Kyrgyzstan
Dams on the Naryn River
Proposed renewable energy power stations in Kyrgyzstan